Skierniewice Rawka railway station is a railway station in Skierniewice, Łódź, Poland. It is served by Koleje Mazowieckie.

Train services
The station is served by the following service(s):

 InterRegio services (IR) Łódź Fabryczna — Warszawa Glowna 
 InterRegio services (IR) Łódź Kaliska — Warszawa Glowna 
 InterRegio services (IR) Ostrów Wielkopolski — Łódź — Warszawa Główna
 InterRegio services (IR) Poznań Główny — Ostrów Wielkopolski — Łódź — Warszawa Główna

References 

Station article at kolej.one.pl

Railway stations in Łódź Voivodeship